Andres Felipé Barrientos (born 6 August 1995), known professionally as Yung Filly, is a British YouTuber and musician. Born in Colombia and later moving to the UK, he began his YouTube career in 2013, starting a music career in 2017. Beginning in 2018, he appeared on numerous shows, several of which he hosted.

Personal life
Barrientos was born in Cali, Colombia; he moved to the UK as a refugee and was raised in Ladywell. He is a supporter of Crystal Palace F.C.

Career
Barrientos began his YouTube career in 2013. His content comprised short skits and comedy Q&As.
As well as building his own channel Yung Filly regularly appears on Footasylum's YouTube Channel starring in dating series Does The Shoe Fit as well as Pro:Direct Soccer's YouTube. 

In 2018, Barrientos hosted Hot Property on BBC Three; the show was described by The Guardian as "so youthful...that it should come with a new kind of 18 certificate". In 2019, he hosted another show on BBC Three titled Dont Scream.

Barrientos appeared for England in Soccer Aid 2020; during the game, he scored a goal. He also appeared on the first episode of a football rivalry series alongside Chunkz, which was aired on BBC Sport.

In 2021, Barrientos appeared on the first episode of Race Around Britain, hosted by Munya Chawawa.

It was announced that he would host a spin-off show of Freeze the Fear with Wim Hof titled Munya and Filly Get Chilly in 2022, which was also hosted by Munya Chawawa. He also appeared on The Great Celebrity Bake Off for SU2C and BBC's Would I Lie To You?

Musical career
In 2017, Barrientos released his debut single, "Take Time". He would release two songs in 2018, "La Paila" and "Mucho Mas".

Barrientos released "Confidence" in 2020, featuring Chunkz and Geko. He would release two other songs with Chunkz in 2020, "Clean Up" and "Hold", which peaked at number 67 and 29 on the UK Singles Chart, respectively. He also featured on Javan's "Again".

Barrientos released "100 Bags Freestyle" in 2021; the song would peak at number 53. He also announced a mixtape titled Last Laugh in an interview with GRM Daily.

In 2022, Barrientos released a new single titled "Long Time"  and later "Day to Day" featuring fellow British rapper and songwriter Chip.

Yung Filly appeared on Chicken Shop Date with Ameilia Dimoldenberg.

Singles

As lead artist

As featured artist

Awards and nominations

References

1995 births
Living people
Black British television personalities
Colombian emigrants to England
Comedy YouTubers
Music YouTubers
Musicians from London
YouTubers from London
English YouTubers